The 1959 Ballon d'Or, given to the best football player in Europe as judged by a panel of sports journalists from UEFA member countries, was awarded to Alfredo Di Stéfano on 15 December 1959. It was the second time that Di Stéfano won the award.

Rankings

Notes

References

External links
 France Football Official Ballon d'Or page

1959
1958–59 in European football